RIEDEL Communications GmbH & Co. KG (formerly Riedel Funk- und Intercomtechnik) is a German manufacturer of communications equipment and an equipment distributor.  Riedel was founded in 1987 in Wuppertal, Germany by Thomas Riedel.

Riedel has three business segments: manufacture of communication equipment, rental services, and radio distribution. The company has over 700 employees and is based in the RIEDEL Technologie Park (Uellendahler Str. 353 in 42109 Wuppertal, Germany).

Description 
Riedel's technology has been used in numerous international events, including Formula 1 races, World Championships and the Olympic Games. Many broadcasting companies, theatres and industrial facilities use Riedel systems for smaller applications and events.
It has also received three Emmy Awards.

In 2013, Riedel received an Emmy for production, features and transmission of the Red Bull Stratos – Felix Baumgartner jump out of a balloon capsule.

Riedel operates in three business fields:

• Manufacturing: 
Riedel designs, manufactures and distributes real-time networks for video, audio, data and communications. The products are used worldwide for broadcast, professional audio, event, sports, theatre, universities and security applications.
• Rental service: 
Riedel provides radio and intercom services, event IT solutions as well as fibre-based and wireless audio and video transmission systems. Riedel offers support services including project planning, logistics, set up and operations for projects of any size.
• Radio distribution: 
Riedel is one of the largest authorized Motorola business partners in Europe (in partnership since 1991).

Milestones & History 
2019: Artist-1024 and acquisition of Embrionix
 At the NAB show in Las Vegas, Riedel introduces the new Artist 1024 node, representing the next evolutionary step of the Artist ecosystem with high port density and native IP support.
 With the acquisition of the Canadian IP video specialist Embrionix, Riedel expands its portfolio of video solutions 

2018: RSP-1232HL SmartPanel and acquisition of Archwave and Cybermatic Audio
 Riedel introduces the new 1200 Series Smartpanel at NAB 2018. According to Riedel the RPS-1232HL represents a quantum leap forward in workflow flexibility, power, and connectivity.
 With the acquisition of Swiss engineering pioneer Archwave, Riedel's development team is expanded to over 100 engineers.

2017: Bolero & 30th anniversary
 At Prolight & Sound 2017, Riedel Communications introduced Bolero, a game-changing new wireless intercom solution. 
 In 2017, Riedel celebrates its 30th year since being founded in 1987 culminating in a party with guests from all over the world.

2016: ASL, Rio, and Delec
 Riedel acquires ASL Intercom BV, extending its portfolio of intercom technology.
 Riedel acquires DELEC Audio- und Videotechnik GmbH, a developer and manufacturer of high-quality digital intercom and communication systems. 
 Riedel contributes to the Games more than 14.000 radios and 20.000 in-ear monitors as well as numerous MediorNet frames. In total, 400 pallets of equipment were shipped to Brazil.

2015: MicroN, MetroN and STX-200 for Skype TX 
 Riedel presents MicroN an 80G Media network at the NAB show in Las Vegas.
 At the ESC in Austria MediorNet MetroN – which has enormous 320-GB real-time routing capacities and gets supplied as a 19“/2HE device – celebrate its debut.
 STX-200 for Skype TX is in use in Real Madrid and India's Got Talent for the first time. STX-200 enables the integration of professional Skype calls in live productions.

2014: Olympic Wintergames and Commonwealth Games Glasgow 
 At the Olympic Winter Games in Sochi, Riedel delivered technical equipment for the venues and was involved in the TV production. Moreover, Riedel built a network for the video-, audio- and intercom signal distribution at the ten competition venues.
 For the first time Riedel is the Official Radio Communications Services Provider for the Glasgow Commonwealth Games.

2012: Red Bull Stratos 
 Riedel enables the wireless transmission of video signals, signal transport and communication while Felix Baumgartner jumps out of the stratosphere. The technical transfer gets awarded with another Emmy.

2011: Eurovision Song Contest 
 For distribution of the video, audio, and communication signals at the Eurovision Song Contest in Düsseldorf the organizer EBU relied on an extensive MediorNet fiber infrastructure from Riedel Communications.
 Riedel installed an integrated system of MediorNet, RockNet, Artist and Performer, which turned the football stadium in a 15.000 square meters big TV-studio.

2009: MediorNet 
 Riedel launches MediorNet, the world’s first fiber-based video network for integrated signal transport.

2005: Red Bull Air Race 
 Riedel provides Red Bull Air Race with extensive communication and transmission technology. In the following years Riedel wins two Emmy Awards for the production.

2004: Partyline and Olympic Games
 Performer, the worldwide first Digital Partyline Intercom System, is launched.
 Riedel at the Olympic Games in Athens: All venues were provided with Artist Intercom and Performer Digital Partyline for the first time. Riedel attended all Olympic Games since 2004.

2002: Olympic Winter Games
 For the first time a Riedel Artist Intercom System is used at the Olympic Winter Games in Salt Lake City at the opening and closing ceremonies

2000: EXPO & Artist
 Artist, the worldwide first decentralized Digital Matrix Intercom System, is launched by Riedel.
 Extensive participation at the EXPO 2000 in Hannover

1998: FIFA Worldcup
 Extensive delivery of radio systems for the ARD and ZDF in all stadiums of the FIFA WC 1998 in France. Riedel attended every FIFA World Cup since 1998.

1994: Olympic Games 
 Riedel receives its first contract for the Olympic Games in Lillehammer. Besides the Olympic Summer and Winter Games, Riedel provides equipment for global events, like FIFA World Cup, the UEFA Euro, the Asia Games and the Eurovision Song Contest today.

1993: Formula One
 Riedel starts equipping Formula One with communication solutions. Today the FIA, and most of the teams as well as the DTM, the WCR rally and other racing events rely on Riedel systems and services.

1991: Motorola and RiFace
 Riedel manufactures its first product: RiFace, an interface between radio and intercom.
 Riedel becomes a Motorola distribution partner.

1987: Founded in Wuppertal, Germany

Products and solutions 
Manufactured products:
 Intercom: ARTIST // TANGO // PERFORMER // BOLERO
 Media networks: MEDIORNET // FUSION // VIRTU
 Audio networks: ROCKNET
 Apps for video: MUON // MICRON

Managed technology products:
 Radio and intercom
 Fiber infrastructure
 Signal distribution
 IT, Wi-fi, internet access
 Network monitoring and remote control
 Cashless payment
 Emergency evacuation systems
 Crowd management
 Accreditation
 Weather monitoring
 Drone detection
 Video surveillance/CCTV

Locations worldwide 
 Australia
 Austria
 China
 France
 Germany
 Japan
 Netherlands
 Russia
Scandinavia
 Singapore
 Spain
 Switzerland
 United Arab Emirates
 United Kingdom
 USA

Engineering hubs:
 Montreal, Canada
 Porto, Portugal
 Vienna, Austria
 Zurich, Switzerland

External links

References 

Electronics companies of Germany
Wuppertal
Electronics companies established in 1987
Telecommunications companies established in 1987
1987 establishments in Germany